It Came From the Late, Late, Late Show is a role-playing game published by Stellar Games in 1989.

Description
It Came From the Late, Late, Late Show is a humor/horror system in which the PCs are actors in bad horror movies come true. There are many skills, a combat system, and many monsters.

Publication history
It Came From the Late, Late, Late Show was designed by Bradley K. McDevitt and Walter H. Mytczynskyj, and published by Stellar Games in 1989 as a 56-page book.
A follow up second edition was published, and two scenario/expansion books.

Reception
In the September 1990 edition of Dragon (#161), Jim Bambra was amused by this game which "lets you play second-rate actors in some of the worst movies ever produced." He recommended it, saying, "Cheap tongue-in-cheek fun, this game is well worth a look."

In his 1991 book Heroic Worlds: A History and Guide to Role-Playing Games, Lawrence Schick commented that "the rules are really secondary to such guideline sections as 'Acting Appropriately Stupid' (explaining why you shouldn't run away when you suspect there are blood-sucking monsters around) and 'Crummy Endings' (tricks for the GM to pull when a scenario goes wrong, e.g., 'Suddenly the sun rises and all the monsters shrivel up and die')."

Reviews
White Wolf #18 (Nov./Dec., 1989)
Windgeflüster (Issue 28 - Dec 1994)

References

Comedy role-playing games
Horror role-playing games
Role-playing games introduced in 1989